The 2016 IIHF World Championship Final was played at the VTB Ice Palace in Moscow, Russia, on 22 May 2016 between Finland and Canada. Canada defeated Finland 2–0 to win the championship. Finland and Canada entered the tournament as the fourth and first place seeds, respectively.

Road to the final

Finland
Finland's last made the final in 2014, losing out to Russia 2–5. The team went undefeated 7–0 record in round robin play, beating opposing finalists Canada 4–0 in the last group game. They then beat Denmark 5–1 in the quarterfinals and Russia 3–1 in the semifinals.

Canada
Defending champions Canada were first seeds coming into the championship. The team went 6–1 record in round robin play, losing to opposing finalists Finland 0–4 in the last group game. They then beat Sweden 6–0 in the quarterfinals and the United States 4–3 in the semifinals.

Summary

Match
Connor McDavid scored his first goal of the tournament for Canada midway through the first period. The scoreline remained the same throughout the second period, despite a sustained Canadian attack. In an attempt to level the match, Finnish goaltender Mikko Koskinen was substituted with a minute to go in the last period for an extra attacker. The game was heading for a slender 1–0 win for the Canadians before Brad Marchand slotted in a second into an empty net in the final second of normal time. Canada goaltender Cam Talbot finished the game with 16 saves for his tournament leading 4th shutout.

References

External links
Official website

Final
2016
IIHF World Championship Final
2016 IIHF World Championship Final
IIHF World Championship Final
IIHF World Championship Final
IIHF World Championship Final
Canada men's national ice hockey team games
Finland men's national ice hockey team games